The 2020–21 Sacramento Kings season was the 76th season of the franchise, its 72nd season in the National Basketball Association (NBA), and its 36th in Sacramento.

The Kings entered the season with the current longest NBA playoff appearance drought at 14 seasons, last qualifying in 2006. On August 14, Vlade Divac resigned from his position as general manager and Monte McNair was named as his replacement on September 17. For the 15th season in a row, the Sacramento Kings failed to reach the playoffs, tying the Los Angeles Clippers for the longest NBA playoff drought and thus became the first team in NBA history to reach a 70 year title drought, not winning a title since 1951.

Draft picks

Roster

Standings

Division

Conference

Notes
 z – Clinched home court advantage for the entire playoffs
 c – Clinched home court advantage for the conference playoffs
 y – Clinched division title
 x – Clinched playoff spot
 pb – Clinched play-in spot
 o – Eliminated from playoff contention
 * – Division leader

Game log

Preseason

|-style="background:#fcc;"
| 1
| December 11
| @ Portland
| 
| Buddy Hield (23)
| Nemanja Bjelica (7)
| De'Aaron Fox (6)
| Moda Center
| 0–1
|-style="background:#cfc;"
| 2
| December 13
| @ Portland
| 
| Guy, Holmes (14)
| Haliburton, Robinson (6)
| Tyrese Haliburton (7)
| Moda Center
| 1–1
|-style="background:#cfc;"
| 3
| December 15
| Golden State
| 
| Kyle Guy (20)
| Hassan Whiteside (9)
| De'Aaron Fox (5)
| Golden 1 Center
| 2–1
|-style="background:#fcc;"
| 4
| December 17
| Golden State
| 
| Harrison Barnes (17)
| Hassan Whiteside (9)
| De'Aaron Fox (12)
| Golden 1 Center
| 2–2

Regular season

|-style="background:#cfc;"
| 1
| December 23
| @ Denver
| 
| Buddy Hield (22)
| Marvin Bagley III (10)
| De'Aaron Fox (7)
| Ball Arena0
| 1–0
|-style="background:#cfc;"
| 2
| December 26
| Phoenix
| 
| De'Aaron Fox (24)
| Bagley III, Barnes (11)
| De'Aaron Fox (5)
| Golden 1 Center0
| 2–0
|-style="background:#fcc;"
| 3
| December 27
| Phoenix
| 
| Buddy Hield (17)
| Richaun Holmes (11)
| Tyrese Haliburton (6)
| Golden 1 Center0
| 2–1
|-style="background:#cfc;"
| 4
| December 29
| Denver
| 
| De'Aaron Fox (24)
| Buddy Hield (8)
| De'Aaron Fox (3)
| Golden 1 Center0
| 3–1
|-style="background:#fcc;"
| 5
| December 31
| @ Houston
| 
| Harrison Barnes (24)
| Richaun Holmes (13)
| De'Aaron Fox (6)
| Toyota Center0
| 3–2

|-style="background:#fcc;"
| 6
| January 2
| @ Houston
| 
| De'Aaron Fox (23)
| Bagley III, Holmes (9)
| De'Aaron Fox (4)
| Toyota Center0
| 3–3
|-style="background:#fcc;"
| 7
| January 4
| @ Golden State
| 
| Bagley III, Fox (18)
| Bagley III, Barnes (9)
| De'Aaron Fox (9)
| Chase Center0
| 3–4
|-style="background:#cfc;"
| 8
| January 6
| Chicago
| 
| Richaun Holmes (24)
| Marvin Bagley III (12)
| Tyrese Haliburton (6)
| Golden 1 Center0
| 4–4
|-style="background:#fcc;"
| 9
| January 8
| Toronto
| 
| De'Aaron Fox (23)
| Buddy Hield (5)
| Barnes, Haliburton (8)
| Golden 1 Center0
| 4–5
|-style="background:#fcc;"
| 10
| January 9
| Portland
| 
| Marvin Bagley III (15)
| Bagley III, Whiteside (8)
| Tyrese Haliburton (8)
| Golden 1 Center0
| 4–6
|-style="background:#cfc;"
| 11
| January 11
| Indiana
| 
| Harrison Barnes (30)
| Richaun Holmes (10)
| De'Aaron Fox (9)
| Golden 1 Center0
| 5–6
|-style="background:#fcc;
| 12
| January 13
| Portland
| 
| De'Aaron Fox (29)
| Richaun Holmes (9)
| Tyrese Haliburton (9)
| Golden 1 Center0
| 5–7
|-style="background:#fcc;"
| 13
| January 15
| L. A. Clippers
| 
| Marvin Bagley III (20)
| Chimezie Metu (8)
| Haliburton, Hield (5)
| Golden 1 Center0
| 5–8
|-style="background:#fcc;"
| 14
| January 17
| New Orleans
| 
| De'Aaron Fox (43)
| Marvin Bagley III (10)
| De'Aaron Fox (13)
| Golden 1 Center0
| 5–9
|-style="background:#fcc;"
| 15
| January 20
| @ L. A. Clippers
| 
| De'Aaron Fox (25)
| Marvin Bagley III (8)
| De'Aaron Fox (7)
| Staples Center0
| 5–10
|-style="background:#cfc;"
| 16
| January 22
| New York
| 
| De'Aaron Fox (22)
| Richaun Holmes (14)
| Barnes, Fox (7)
| Golden 1 Center0
| 6–10
|-style="background:#ccc;"
| –
| January 24
| @ Memphis
| colspan="6" | Postponed (COVID-19) (Makeup date: May 13)
|-style="background:#ccc;"
| –
| January 25
| @ Memphis
| colspan="6" | Postponed (COVID-19) (Makeup date: May 14)
|-style="background:#cfc;"
| 17
| January 27
| @ Orlando
| 
| Harrison Barnes (21)
| Bagley III, Holmes (12)
| De'Aaron Fox (10)
| Amway CenterLimited seating
| 7–10
|-style="background:#cfc;"
| 18
| January 29
| @ Toronto
| 
| Harrison Barnes (26)
| Harrison Barnes (7)
| Tyrese Haliburton (11)
| Amalie Arena0
| 8–10
|-style="background:#fcc;"
| 19
| January 30
| @ Miami
| 
| De'Aaron Fox (30)
| Tyrese Haliburton (7)
| Fox, Haliburton (6)
| American Airlines ArenaLimited seating
| 8–11

|-style="background:#cfc;"
| 20
| February 1
| @ New Orleans
| 
| De'Aaron Fox (38)
| Tyrese Haliburton (11)
| De'Aaron Fox (12)
| Smoothie King Center1,440
| 9–11
|-style="background:#cfc;"
| 21
| February 3
| Boston
| 
| De'Aaron Fox (26)
| Buddy Hield (10)
| De'Aaron Fox (11)
| Golden 1 Center0
| 10–11
|-style="background:#cfc;"
| 22
| February 6
| Denver
| 
| Harrison Barnes (28)
| Hassan Whiteside (11)
| Buddy Hield (7)
| Golden 1 Center0
| 11–11
|-style="background:#cfc;"
| 23
| February 7
| @ L. A. Clippers
| 
| De'Aaron Fox (36)
| Harrison Barnes (12)
| De'Aaron Fox (7)
| Staples Center0
| 12–11
|-style="background:#fcc;"
| 24
| February 9
| Philadelphia
| 
| De'Aaron Fox (34)
| Harrison Barnes (7)
| De'Aaron Fox (10)
| Golden 1 Center0
| 12–12
|-style="background:#fcc;"
| 25
| February 13
| Orlando
| 
| Buddy Hield (19)
| Nemanja Bjelica (9)
| Tyrese Haliburton (7)
| Golden 1 Center0
| 12–13
|-style="background:#fcc;"
| 26
| February 14
| Memphis
| 
| De'Aaron Fox (23)
| Buddy Hield (6)
| De'Aaron Fox (9)
| Golden 1 Center0
| 12–14
|-style="background:#fcc;"
| 27
| February 15
| Brooklyn
| 
| Hassan Whiteside (26)
| Hassan Whiteside (16)
| De'Aaron Fox (8)
| Golden 1 Center0
| 12–15
|-style="background:#fcc;"
| 28
| February 18
| Miami
| 
| Nemanja Bjelica (25)
| Marvin Bagley III (10)
| De'Aaron Fox (10)
| Golden 1 Center0
| 12–16
|-style="background:#fcc;"
| 29
| February 20
| @ Chicago
| 
| Marvin Bagley III (26)
| Marvin Bagley III (11)
| De'Aaron Fox (9)
| United Center0
| 12–17
|-style="background:#fcc;"
| 30
| February 21
| @ Milwaukee
| 
| Tyrese Haliburton (23)
| Richaun Holmes (11)
| De'Aaron Fox (10)
| Fiserv Forum1,800
| 12–18
|-style="background:#fcc;"
| 31
| February 23
| @ Brooklyn
| 
| De'Aaron Fox (27)
| Richaun Holmes (11)
| Tyrese Haliburton (9)
| Barclays Center324
| 12–19
|-style="background:#fcc;"
| 32
| February 25
| @ New York
| 
| De'Aaron Fox (29)
| Harrison Barnes (7)
| De'Aaron Fox (11)
| Madison Square Garden1,981
| 12–20
|-style="background:#cfc;"
| 33
| February 26
| @ Detroit
| 
| De'Aaron Fox (27)
| Richaun Holmes (17)
| Harrison Barnes (7)
| Little Caesars Arena0
| 13–20
|-style="background:#fcc;"
| 34
| February 28
| Charlotte
| 
| Harrison Barnes (28)
| Marvin Bagley III (10)
| De'Aaron Fox (14)
| Golden 1 Center0
| 13–21

|-style="background:#cfc;"
| 35
| March 3
| L. A. Lakers
| 
| Buddy Hield (29)
| Richaun Holmes (9)
| De'Aaron Fox (8)
| Golden 1 Center0
| 14–21
|-style="background:#fcc;"
| 36
| March 4
| @ Portland
| 
| De'Aaron Fox (32)
| Richaun Holmes (11)
| De'Aaron Fox (12)
| Moda Center0
| 14–22
|-style="background:#cfc;"
| 37
| March 11
| Houston
| 
| De'Aaron Fox (30)
| Barnes, Holmes (11)
| De'Aaron Fox (9)
| Golden 1 Center0
| 15–22
|-style="background:#fcc;"
| 38
| March 13
| @ Atlanta
| 
| De'Aaron Fox (32)
| Richaun Holmes (12)
| De'Aaron Fox (6)
| State Farm Arena2,347
| 15–23
|-style="background:#fcc;"
| 39
| March 15
| @ Charlotte
| 
| De'Aaron Fox (29)
| Richaun Holmes (15)
| De'Aaron Fox (8)
| Spectrum Center2,861
| 15–24
|-style="background:#cfc;"
| 40
| March 17
| @ Washington
| 
| De'Aaron Fox (28)
| Harrison Barnes (8)
| De'Aaron Fox (7)
| Capital One Arena0
| 16–24
|-style="background:#cfc;"
| 41
| March 19
| @ Boston
| 
| De'Aaron Fox (29)
| Richaun Holmes (11)
| Tyrese Haliburton (7)
| TD Garden0
| 17–24
|-style="background:#fcc;"
| 42
| March 20
| @ Philadelphia
| 
| Buddy Hield (25)
| Harrison Barnes (7)
| Cory Joseph (7)
| Wells Fargo Center3,071
| 17–25
|-style="background:#cfc;"
| 43
| March 22
| @ Cleveland
| 
| De'Aaron Fox (30)
| Richaun Holmes (16)
| Harrison Barnes (8)
| Rocket Mortgage FieldHouse4,100
| 18–25
|-style="background:#cfc;"
| 44
| March 24
| Atlanta
| 
| De'Aaron Fox (37)
| Hassan Whiteside (12)
| Tyrese Haliburton (7)
| Golden 1 Center0
| 19–25
|-style="background:#cfc;"
| 45
| March 25
| Golden State
| 
| De'Aaron Fox (44)
| Richaun Holmes (11)
| De'Aaron Fox (7)
| Golden 1 Center0
| 20–25
|-style="background:#cfc;"
| 46
| March 27
| Cleveland
| 
| De'Aaron Fox (36)
| Richaun Holmes (14)
| De'Aaron Fox (6)
| Golden 1 Center0
| 21–25
|-style="background:#cfc;"
| 47
| March 29
| @ San Antonio
| 
| De'Aaron Fox (24)
| Richaun Holmes (12)
| Tyrese Haliburton (10)
| AT&T Center2,876
| 22–25
|-style="background:#fcc;"
| 48
| March 31
| @ San Antonio
| 
| De'Aaron Fox (20)
| Richaun Holmes (15)
| Harrison Barnes (5)
| AT&T Center2,802
| 22–26

|-style="background:#fcc;"
| 49
| April 2
| L. A. Lakers
| 
| Harrison Barnes (26)
| Richaun Holmes (7)
| Barnes, Fox (5)
| Golden 1 Center0
| 22–27
|-style="background:#fcc;"
| 50
| April 3
| Milwaukee
| 
| Davis, Fox (27)
| Richaun Holmes (9)
| Tyrese Haliburton (11)
| Golden 1 Center0
| 22–28
|-style="background:#fcc;"
| 51
| April 5
| @ Minnesota
| 
| De'Aaron Fox (31)
| Harrison Barnes (12)
| De'Aaron Fox (9)
| Target Center1,436
| 22–29
|-style="background:#fcc;"
| 52
| April 8
| Detroit
| 
| De'Aaron Fox (23)
| Fox, Holmes (9)
| Fox, Haliburton (7)
| Golden 1 Center0
| 22–30
|-style="background:#fcc;"
| 53
| April 10
| @ Utah
| 
| De'Aaron Fox (30)
| Richaun Holmes (10)
| De'Aaron Fox (8)
| Vivint Arena5,546
| 22–31
|-style="background:#fcc;"
| 54
| April 12
| @ New Orleans
| 
| De'Aaron Fox (43)
| Harrison Barnes (11)
| Fox, Haliburton (6)
| Smoothie King Center3,700
| 22–32
|-style="background:#fcc;"
| 55
| April 14
| Washington
| 
| De'Aaron Fox (33)
| Harrison Barnes (7)
| Fox, Haliburton (6)
| Golden 1 Center0
| 22–33
|-style="background:#fcc;"
| 56
| April 15
| @ Phoenix
| 
| De'Aaron Fox (27)
| Hassan Whiteside (10)
| De'Aaron Fox (8)
| Phoenix Suns Arena4,568
| 22–34
|-style="background:#cfc;"
| 57
| April 18
| @ Dallas
| 
| De'Aaron Fox (30)
| Hassan Whiteside (10)
| De'Aaron Fox (12)
| American Airlines Center4,193
| 23–34
|-style="background:#fcc;"
| 58
| April 20
| Minnesota
| 
| Barnes, Harkless (20)
| Harrison Barnes (8)
| Tyrese Haliburton (9)
| Golden 1 Center0
| 23–35
|-style="background:#cfc;"
| 59
| April 21
| Minnesota
| 
| De'Aaron Fox (30)
| Damian Jones (8)
| Barnes, Fox (7)
| Golden 1 Center0
| 24–35
|-style="background:#fcc;"
| 60
| April 25
| @ Golden State
| 
| Buddy Hield (25)
| Harrison Barnes (7)
| Tyrese Haliburton (8)
| Chase Center3,252
| 24–36
|-style="background:#cfc;"
| 61
| April 26
| Dallas
| 
| Richaun Holmes (24)
| Damian Jones (7)
| Tyrese Haliburton (10)
| Golden 1 Center0
| 25–36
|-style="background:#fcc;"
| 62
| April 28
| Utah
| 
| Hield, Holmes (18)
| Davis, Hield, Metu (5)
| Tyrese Haliburton (8)
| Golden 1 Center0
| 25–37
|-style="background:#cfc;"
| 63
| April 30
| @ L. A. Lakers
| 
| Tyrese Haliburton (23)
| Richaun Holmes (9)
| Tyrese Haliburton (10)
| Staples Center2,691
| 26–37

|-style="background:#cfc;"
| 64
| May 2
| @ Dallas
| 
| Buddy Hield (27)
| Marvin Bagley III (9)
| Terence Davis (7)
| American Airlines Center4,268
| 27–37
|-style="background:#cfc;"
| 65
| May 4
| @ Oklahoma City
| 
| Hield, Davis (18)
| Buddy Hield (11)
| Delon Wright (8)
| Chesapeake Energy Arena0
| 28–37
|-style="background:#cfc;"
| 66
| May 5
| @ Indiana
| 
| Marvin Bagley III (31)
| Marvin Bagley III (12)
| Buddy Hield (8)
| Bankers Life Fieldhouse0
| 29–37
|-style="background:#fcc;"
| 67
| May 7
| San Antonio
| 
| Terence Davis (24)
| Damian Jones (6)
| Jones, Wright (7)
| Golden 1 Center0
| 29–38
|-style="background:#cfc;"
| 68
| May 9
| Oklahoma City
| 
| Davis, Harkless (18)
| Bagley III, Metu (9)
| Davis, Hield (7)
| Golden 1 Center0
| 30–38
|-style="background:#cfc;"
| 69
| May 11
| Oklahoma City
| 
| Terence Davis (27)
| Holmes, Jones (7)
| Delon Wright (8)
| Golden 1 Center0
| 31–38
|-style="background:#fcc;"
| 70
| May 13
| @ Memphis
| 
| Justin James (31)
| Davis, Jones, Metu (5)
| Delon Wright (8)
| FedExForum2,876
| 31–39
|-style="background:#fcc;"
| 71
| May 14
| @ Memphis
| 
| Louis King (27)
| Damian Jones (11)
| Buddy Hield (5)
| FedExForum3,502
| 31–40
|-style="background:#fcc;"
| 72
| May 16
| Utah
| 
| Damian Jones (19)
| Chimezie Metu (8)
| Buddy Hield (9)
| Golden 1 Center0
| 31–41

Transactions

Trades

Free agency

Re-signed

Additions

Subtractions

References

Sacramento Kings seasons
Sacramento Kings
Sacramento Kings
Sacramento Kings